Degrassi is a Canadian teen drama franchise created by Linda Schuyler and Kit Hood in 1979. The franchise spans five main series: The Kids of Degrassi Street, Degrassi Junior High, Degrassi High, Degrassi: The Next Generation, and Degrassi: Next Class, as well as several made-for-television movies, web miniseries and novelizations. Beginning as a series of short films about children who live on or near De Grassi Street in Toronto, Ontario, starting with Degrassi Junior High, the franchise began to focus on an ensemble cast of students attending various schools with the Degrassi name as they confront various issues and challenges. Also starting from Degrassi Junior High, the franchise became a cultural phenomenon in Canada and a cult hit in the United States, garnering critical acclaim for its realistic portrayal of adolescence.

Throughout the years, the franchise (save Next Class) has seen numerous releases to VHS and DVD. In the United States, Degrassi Junior High and Degrassi High were initially distributed in the late 1980s by mail order from Direct Cinema Ltd. for educational use. Large VHS box sets of Degrassi Junior High and Degrassi High were released in 1999 and 2000 by WGBH Boston Home Video, followed by DVD releases in 2005 and 2007, respectively. Degrassi: The Next Generation was distributed on home video in Canada by Alliance Home Entertainment, and in the United States by FUNimation Entertainment and later Echo Bridge Entertainment, with all but it's thirteenth and fourteenth seasons released to DVD.

The Kids of Degrassi Street

VHS

DVD

Degrassi Junior High

VHS

DVD

Streaming 
In 2019, Encore+, the YouTube channel of Canada Media Fund, made the entirety of Degrassi Junior High available free to view, in both English and French.

Degrassi High

VHS

DVD

School's Out

VHS

DVD

Degrassi: The Next Generation

Future DVD releases 
In 2015, Stephen Stohn stated on Twitter that they had delivered the elements for the season 13 DVD release, but the distributor changed.

References 

Degrassi lists
Lists of home video releases